Rescue is the fifth studio album by the Canadian post-hardcore band Silverstein. It was released on 26 April 2011, the first full-length album to be released through Hopeless Records.

Recording
Rescue was produced by Jordan Valeriote and mixed by Cameron Webb. The album was recorded over a longer period of time than any of their other albums, taking place over two separate sessions over a year apart, which the band has since said caused the album to have a more ‘disjointed’ feeling.  Initial sessions for the album took place in the spring of 2009 shortly after the release of their fourth full length album A Shipwreck In The Sand. The release of Shipwreck completed their contract with Victory Records and they recorded about 5-6 new songs that would end up on Rescue to shop to new record labels, ultimately settling on Hopeless Records. Three of these demos were included on the deluxe version of the album.

Music and lyrics
The material on Rescue was described by Told as "a cross between Discovering and Shipwreck".

Rescue contains  two songs from the band's previously released EP Transitions.

Release and reception

A music video was released for the song "Sacrifice". On February 5, 2011, the band played a free show in Toronto, with Robby Starbuck filming the event for a music video for the song "The Artist", released on March 28. Frontman, Shane Told revealed that a video will also be released for the song "Burning Hearts". Told also announced that there will be a 7" vinyl release for "The Artist" on their Record Store Day and it will have 3 exclusive covers as B-sides along with there being an iTunes exclusive track for the album as well. In April and May, the band co-headlined the Take Action Tour with Bayside. They were supported by Polar Bear Club, The Swellers and Texas in July.

Track listing
All songs written and performed by Silverstein, with specific writers for each track.

Personnel
Personnel per digital booklet.

Silverstein
 Shane Told – lead vocals, keyboards, piano on (Forget Your Heart (Piano version))
 Paul Koehler – drums, percussion
 Josh Bradford – rhythm guitar
 Neil Boshart – lead guitar
 Billy Hamilton – bass, backing vocals

Additional musicians
 Anna Jarvis – cello
 Paul-Marc Rousseau, Ben Bradford, Josh Bradford, Neil Boshart, Billy Hamilton, Shane Told – gang vocals
 Anthony Raneri – additional vocals on track 6
 Brendan Murphy – additional vocals on track 7

Production
 Jordan Valeriote – producer, engineer
 Cameron Webb – mixing
 Joah Carvalho – mastering
 Inaam Haq – assistant engineer at Cherry Beach
 Shaun Gowman – drum tech
 Martin Wittfooth – artwork
 Brooks Reynolds – band photo
 Sons of Nero – layout

Chart positions

References
 Footnotes

 Citations

External links

Rescue at YouTube (streamed copy where licensed)

2011 albums
Hopeless Records albums
Silverstein (band) albums